Nguyễn Hải Thần (born Nguyễn Văn Thắng in Dai Tu village, Thường Tín District, Hà Đông Province, circa 1869; died 1959; also known as Vũ Hải Thu) was a leader of the Việt Nam Cách Mạng Đồng Minh Hội (Vietnamese Revolutionary Alliance) and a political leader during the Vietnamese Revolution.

Biography
In 1905, he left Vietnam to study at military academies first in Japan then in China as part of Phan Bội Châu's Đông-Du Movement (Travel to the East).  In 1912, he joined Châu's Vietnam Restoration League (Việt Nam Quang Phục Hội) and became one of its representatives in Kwangsi and one of its most capable military leaders.

After Châu's capture in 1925 that led to the league's demise, Thần and other revolutionaries in China founded the Việt Nam Cách Mạng Đồng Minh Hội. Thần was respected by many Chinese officials and overseas Vietnamese revolutionaries, and his views were usually held in high regards. Using his good relationship with Chiang Kai-shek, he lobbied for the release and pardon of Hồ Chí Minh when the latter was in jail waiting to be executed for "crimes against the French colonial government".

In September 1945, Hồ and the Communists seized the government from Emperor Bảo Đại and founded the Democratic Republic of Vietnam.  Thần briefly joined Hồ's coalition government that comprised several non-Communist party leaders.  After Hồ signed a modus vivendi Marius Moutet (Minister of Overseas France and her Colonies), France was able to return to its former colony. The move bought Hồ precious time to deal with the non-communist military forces. As soon as the Chinese troops that had entered Vietnam to disarm the Japanese were replaced by French expeditionary forces, Hồ's Việt Minh attacked all non-communist bases in the country.  Thần, who opposed Hồ's communist connections, fled to Nanjing, China where he remained until his death in 1951.

References

Vietnamese nationalists
Vietnamese revolutionaries
Việt Nam Quang Phục Hội politicians
1951 deaths
Deputy Prime Ministers of Vietnam
1869 births